The 1962–63 Montenegrin Republic League was 18th season of Montenegrin Republic League. Season started in August 1962 and finished in May 1963.

Season 

Before the start of 18th edition of the League, number of participants was expanded to 10 (on season 1961–62 played nine teams. Except the teams from previous year, a new member of the competition was Ivangrad. Just before the start of season, Čelik withdrawn by their own decision, so their place was given to Iskra.
At the end of 18 weeks long competition, Lovćen and Jedinstvo were equalised on the top of the table. But, because of better goal difference, Lovćen won the title and participated in the qualifiers for Yugoslav Second League.
Last-placed Arsenal was relegated.

Table

Qualifiers for Yugoslav Second League 
Lovćen played in the qualifiers for 1963–64 Second League - East. They were defeated by champion of Republic League of SR Macedonia - Pobeda, so didn't get promotion to higher level.

Higher leagues 
On season 1962–63, two Montenegrin teams played in higher leagues of SFR Yugoslavia. Budućnost participated in 1962–63 Yugoslav First League, while Sutjeska) played in 1962–63 Yugoslav Second League.

See also 
 Montenegrin Republic League
 Montenegrin Republic Cup (1947–2006)
 Montenegrin clubs in Yugoslav football competitions (1946–2006)
 Montenegrin Football Championship (1922–1940)

References 

Montenegrin Republic League